Horatio Gates Spafford (October 20, 1828, Troy, New York – September 25, 1888, Jerusalem) was a prominent American lawyer and Presbyterian church elder.  He is best known for penning the Christian hymn It Is Well With My Soul following a family tragedy in which his four daughters died aboard the S.S. Ville du Havre on a transatlantic voyage.

Life 

Spafford was the son of Gazetteer author Horatio Gates Spafford and Elizabeth Clark Hewitt Spafford.

On September 5, 1861, he married Anna Larsen of Stavanger, Norway, in Chicago. Spafford was a lawyer and a senior partner in a large law firm.
The Spaffords were supporters and friends of evangelist Dwight L. Moody.

Spafford invested in real estate north of Chicago in the spring of 1871. In October 1871, the Great Fire of Chicago reduced the city to ashes, destroying most of Spafford's investment.

Ville du Havre
Two years after the devastation of the Great Chicago Fire, the family planned a trip to Europe. Late business demands (zoning issues arising from the conflagration) kept Spafford from joining his wife and four daughters on a family vacation in England, where his friend D. L. Moody would be preaching.

On November 22, 1873, while crossing the Atlantic on the steamship Ville du Havre, the ship was struck by an iron sailing vessel, killing 226 people, including all four of Spafford's daughters: Annie, age 12; Maggie, 7; Bessie, 4; and an 18-month old baby. His wife, Anna, survived the tragedy. Upon arriving in Cardiff, Wales, she sent a telegram to Spafford that read "Saved alone." Shortly afterwards, as Spafford traveled to meet his grieving wife, he was inspired to write It Is Well with My Soul as his ship passed near where his daughters had died.

It Is Well with My Soul  

The original manuscript has only four verses, but Spafford's daughter, Bertha Spafford Vester (author of Our Jerusalem: An American Family in the Holy City 1881-1949), who was born after the tragedy, said a verse was later added and the last line of the original song was modified. 

The tune, written by Philip Bliss, was named after the ship on which Spafford's daughters died, Ville du Havre.

When peace, like a river, attendeth my way,
When sorrows like sea billows roll;
Whatever my lot, Thou hast taught me to say,
It is well, it is well with my soul.

(Refrain:) It is well (it is well),
with my soul (with my soul),
It is well, it is well with my soul.

Though Satan should buffet, though trials should come,
Let this blest assurance control,
That Christ hath regarded my helpless estate,
And hath shed His own blood for my soul.
(Refrain)

My sin, oh the bliss of this glorious thought!
My sin, not in part but the whole,
Is nailed to His cross, and I bear it no more,
Praise the Lord, praise the Lord, O my soul!
(Refrain)

For me, be it Christ, be it Christ hence to live:
If Jordan above me shall roll,
No pain shall be mine, for in death as in life
Thou wilt whisper Thy peace to my soul.
(Refrain)

And Lord haste the day, when the faith shall be sight,
The clouds be rolled back as a scroll;
The trump shall resound, and the Lord shall descend,
Even so, it is well with my soul.
(Refrain)

Later years
Following the sinking of the Ville du Havre, Anna gave birth to three children, Horatio Goertner (1877), Bertha Hedges (March 24, 1878), and Grace (January 18, 1881). On February 11, 1880, their son Horatio died of scarlet fever at age three.  This final tragedy, after a decade of financial loss and personal grief accompanied by a lack of support from their church community, began Spafford's philosophical move away from material success toward a lifelong spiritual pilgrimage.  Anna and Horatio Spafford soon left the Presbyterian congregation Horatio had helped build and hosted prayer meetings in their home. Their Messianic sect was dubbed "the Overcomers" by the American press.

In August 1881, the Spaffords went to Jerusalem as a party of 13 adults and three children to set up the American Colony. Colony members, joined by Swedish Christians, engaged in philanthropic work among the people of Jerusalem regardless of their religious affiliation and without proselytizing motives, gaining the trust of the local Muslim, Jewish, and Christian communities. The community required both single and married adherents to declare celibacy, and children were separated from their parents. Child labor was used in various business endeavors while in Jerusalem.

In Jerusalem, Horatio and Anna Spafford adopted a teenager, Jacob Eliahu (1864–1932), who was born in Ramallah into a Turkish Jewish family. As a schoolboy, Jacob Spafford discovered the Siloam inscription.

Death
Spafford died of malaria on September 25, 1888, and was buried in Mount Zion Cemetery in Jerusalem.

Legacy
At the Eastern front during and after World War I, and during the Armenian and Assyrian genocides, the American Colony supported the Muslim, Jewish, and Christian communities of Jerusalem by hosting soup kitchens, hospitals, and orphanages.

References

External links 

 SpaffordHymn.com : The original hymn manuscript penned by Horatio Spafford
 Cyber Hymnal : Photos of Horatio Spafford and a MIDI file of the hymn
 Elisabeth Elliot recalls tea with Horatio Spafford's daughter
 Gospelcom.net
 Christianity.ca : Many details on life of Spafford
 The Library of Congress Exhibition covering the start of The American Colony in Jerusalem, the Spafford Family tragedy, their move to Jerusalem, their time in the Holy Land, and the American Colony at work
 
 

American Christian hymnwriters
American evangelicals
American Protestants
Writers from Troy, New York
Deaths from malaria
Burials at Mount Zion (Protestant)
1828 births
1888 deaths
19th-century American poets
American male poets
American emigrants to the Ottoman Empire
19th-century American male writers
American male non-fiction writers
19th-century American lawyers